Thomas Buryton (fl. 1383–1399) of Hereford, was an English politician.

He was a Member (MP) of the Parliament of England for Hereford in February 1383, 1391, 1393, September 1397 and 1399.

References

Year of birth missing
Year of death missing
English MPs February 1383
English MPs 1391
English MPs 1393
English MPs September 1397
English MPs 1399
14th-century English politicians
People from Hereford